Artemisia sieversiana is a species of flowering plant belonging to the family Asteraceae.

Its native range is Siberia to Afghanistan and Japan.

References

sieversiana